Eucalyptus aurifodina, commonly known as the small-leaved brown stringybark is a rare small tree that is endemic to the goldfields area of Victoria. It has rough, stringy bark on its trunk and branches, glossy green elliptic to egg-shaped adult leaves, oval or slightly club-shaped buds arranged in groups of seven to eleven, white flowers and hemispherical fruit.

Description
They are more or less the same colour on both surfaces. Flowering occurs in early autumn and the flowers are white.

Taxonomy and naming
Eucalyptus aurifodina was first formally described in 2012 by Kevin James Rule and the description was published in the journal Muelleria from a specimen collected near Maldon. The specific epithet (aurifodina) is derived from the Latin word aurifer meaning "gold-bearing", referring to the species distribution.

Distribution and habitat
The small-leaved brown stringybark is a rare tree that grows in dry woodland in stony places between Castlemaine and Avoca in Victoria, Australia.

References

Flora of Victoria (Australia)
Trees of Australia
aurifodina
Myrtales of Australia
Plants described in 2012